The Curtiss SOC Seagull was an American single-engined scout observation seaplane, designed by Alexander Solla of the Curtiss-Wright Corporation for the United States Navy. The aircraft served on battleships and cruisers in a seaplane configuration, being launched by catapult and recovered from a sea landing. The wings folded back against the fuselage for storage aboard ship. When based ashore or on carriers the single float was replaced by fixed wheeled landing gear.

Curtiss delivered 258 SOC aircraft, in versions SOC-1 through SOC-4, beginning in 1935. The SOC-3 design was the basis of the Naval Aircraft Factory SON-1 variant, of which the NAF delivered 64 aircraft from 1940.

Design and development
The SOC was ordered for production by the United States Navy in 1933 and first entered service in 1935. The first order was for 135 SOC-1 models, which was followed by 40 SOC-2 models for landing operations and 83 SOC-3s. A variant of the SOC-3 was built by the Naval Aircraft Factory and was known as the SON-1.

Operational history
The first ship the SOC was assigned to was the light cruiser  in November 1935; by the end of the decade, the SOC had replaced its predecessor throughout the fleet. Production came to an end in 1938. By 1941, most battleships had transitioned to the Vought OS2U Kingfisher and cruisers were expected to replace their aging SOCs with the third generation SO3C Seamew. The SO3C, however, suffered from a weak engine and plans to adopt it as a replacement were scrapped. The SOC, despite belonging to an earlier generation, went on to execute its missions of gunfire observation and limited range scouting missions.

Through the first six months of naval service, the SOC was known as the XO3C-1, The designation was changed to SOC when it was decided to merge its scouting and observation roles. The SOC was not called the Seagull until 1941, when the U.S. Navy began the wholesale adoption of popular names for aircraft in addition to their alpha-numeric designations. The name 'Seagull' had earlier been given to two civil Curtiss aircraft, a Curtiss Model 18 and a Model 25, both converted Curtiss MF flying boats.

When operating as a seaplane, returning SOCs would land on the relatively smooth ocean surface created on the sheltered side of the vessel as it made a wide turn, after which the aircraft would be winched back onto the deck.

When the SOC was replaced by the OS2U Kingfisher, most remaining airframes were converted into trainers; they remained in use until 1945. With the failure of the Curtiss SO3C Seamew, many SOCs in second line service were returned to frontline units starting in late 1943. They saw service aboard warships in the combat zone for the rest of World War II. This is one of the few instances in aviation history in which an older aircraft type, that was retired or sent to second line service, replaced the new aircraft type that was intended to replace it.

Variants

 XO3C-1 (Curtiss Model 71) Prototype aircraft, powered by 550 hp (410 kW) Pratt & Whitney R-1340-12 engine. One built, redesignated XSOC-1 on 23 March 1935.
 SOC-1 (Curtiss Model 71A) Initial production version, with 550 hp (410 kW) Pratt & Whitney R-1340-18 engine enclosed in NACA cowling. Interchangeable float and wheeled undercarriage. 135 built.
 SOC-2 (Curtiss Model 71B) Minor changes, with R-1340-22 engine. 40 built. Wheeled undercarriage only.
 XSO2C-1 (Curtiss Model 71C) Improved version. One prototype only, no production.
 SOC-3 (Curtiss Model 71E) Similar to SOC-2, but with interchangeable undercarriage. 83 built by Curtiss as SOC-3 with further 64 built by the Naval Aircraft Factory as the SON-1.
 SOC-3A All SOC-4s were transferred to the U.S. Navy in 1942 (BuNo 48243, 48244, 48245, respectively), which modified them SOC-3A standard, meaning the fitting of a deck arrester gear.
 SOC-4 (Curtiss Model 71F): The U.S. Coast Guard acquired the final three SOC-3 Seagulls produced by Curtiss in 1938 and these were designated as SOC-4s. They were assigned the USCG call numbers V171, V172, and V173.
 SO2C One built for evaluation based on the SOC-3, but with a 5-foot fuselage stretch and powered by a R-1340-35.
 SON-1 SOC-3 aircraft produced by the Naval Aircraft Factory, 64 built.

Operators

 United States Navy
 United States Marine Corps
 United States Coast Guard

Specifications (SOC-1 floatplane)

See also

References
Notes

Bibliography

 Bowers, Peter M. Curtiss Aircraft, 1907-1947. London: Putnam & Company Ltd., 1979. .
 Donald, David. The Complete Encyclopedia of World Aircraft. Orbis Publishing Limited, 1997. .
 Green, William. War Planes of the Second World War, Volume Six: Floatplanes. London: Macdonald & Co. (Publishers) Ltd., 1962.
 Larkins, William T. The Curtiss SOC Seagull (Aircraft in Profile number 194). Leatherhead, Surrey, UK: Profile Publications Ltd., 1967. OCLC 43484775.
 Larkins, William T. Battleship and Cruiser Aircraft of the United States Navy. Atglen, PA: Schiffer Books, Inc., 1996. . OCLC 35720248.
 Mondey, David. The Hamlyn Concise Guide to American Aircraft of World War  II. London: Chancellor Press, 1996. .
 Munson, Kenneth. US Warbirds, From World War 1 to Vietnam. New York: New Orchard, 1985. .
 Swanborough, Gordon and Peter M. Bowers. United States Navy Aircraft since 1911. London: Putnam & Company Ltd., Second edition, 1976. .

External links

 Site on the SOC by Commander Ralph "Kaiser" Wilhelm, USN (Ret.)
 Official U.S. Navy Historical Center site on the SOC with images. 
 Site on the SOC using material by William Larkins
 Cruiser Scout, by Paul A. McKinley Account of an SOC-2 crewman on the USS San Francisco

Floatplanes
SO1C Seagull
1930s United States military reconnaissance aircraft
SON
Single-engined tractor aircraft
Biplanes
Carrier-based aircraft
Aircraft first flown in 1934